Julien N'Da (born 15 August 1985) is an Ivorian/French footballer. He has represented the Ivory Coast national football team at Under-21 level on several occasions.

He started his career at French Ligue 2 outfit Chamois Niortais, where he joined the youth set-up at just 6 years old. He later moved to French Championnat de France amateur team FC Rouen where after a series of impressive performances he was recommended to Accrington Stanley boss John Coleman who signed him on 31 May 2006. He was expected to play a crucial part in Accrington's first season back in the Football League, but unfortunately suffered medial ligament damage after making only 3 substitute league appearances (5 in all competitions). One of these appearances was as a late substitute in a memorable League Cup win over Nottingham Forest. His contract was terminated by mutual consent in November 2006.

References

Julien N'Da profile at foot-national.com

1985 births
Living people
French footballers
French sportspeople of Ivorian descent
Ivorian footballers
Association football defenders
Chamois Niortais F.C. players
FC Rouen players
Accrington Stanley F.C. players
FC Gueugnon players
AS Moulins players
Racing Besançon players
FC Chauray players
English Football League players
Ligue 2 players
Championnat National players